Meanja is situated in Moungo, Littoral, Cameroon. Its geographical coordinates are 4° 16' 23" North, 9° 23' 32" East and its original name (with diacritics) is Meanja.

Littoral Region (Cameroon)